The Merry Goes 'Round is the tenth studio album by American recording artist Jewel. Released on September 27, 2011 on the Fisher-Price label, The Merry Goes 'Round is the follow-up album to Lullaby, Jewel's first album of children's songs. According to Jewel, the songs are "not just for children, but also adults".

The album was released a few months after Jewel gave birth to her first child, Kase Townes Murray. Speaking of her life as a new mother, Jewel noted, "No matter how much you get in life professionally, nothing in life compares to that sheer beauty and purity of your child." The album offers a diverse set of songs, from "back porch singalongs" to jazz-based melodies to traditional folk songs.

Reception

The Merry Goes 'Round received three and a half out of five stars on the AllMusic website. James Christopher Monger described the songs as "mostly original, country-folk kids' songs that are sweet and silly enough to hold the attention of a roomful of little ones, and breezy and folksy enough to keep their parents from launching a sippy cup into the speakers".

Track listing
All songs were written by Jewel and Patrick Davis except where noted. 
 "Sammy the Spider" – 4:47
 "Supermarket Song" – 3:36
 "Just Like Penguins Do" – 4:39
 "Bucky the Bull" – 4:32
 "She'll Be Coming 'Round the Mountain" (Traditional) – 2:26
 "Sara Swan Sleepy Head" – 4:32
 "Play Day" – 3:12
 "Only Shadows" – 3:18
 "Oh! Susanna" (Stephen Foster) – 2:22
 "Give Me the Rainbow" – 4:08
 "My Favorite Things" (Richard Rodgers, Oscar Hammerstein II) – 3:46
 "And the Green Grass Grows All Around" (William Jerome, Harry Von Tilzer) – 4:09
 "Snooze Button Blues" – 3:30
 "Happy" – 3:55
 "In My Room" – 3:55
 "Count on Me" – 4:41

Personnel
 Jewel – vocals, guitar

References

External links
 Official website

2011 albums
Children's music albums by American artists
Jewel (singer) albums